Ward Island may refer to:

Mākaro/Ward Island, in Wellington Harbour, New Zealand
Ward Island (Texas), in Corpus Christi
Ward Island (California), an island in the Sacramento–San Joaquin River Delta

See also
Wards Island, in New York
Ward Hunt Island, in the Canadian Arctic
Ward Islands (South Australia)
 Ward's Island - common name for the eastern end of Centre Island in Toronto